Kahanna Montrese (born March 25, 1993) is an American drag performer most known for competing on season 11 of RuPaul's Drag Race.

Career
Kahanna Montrese competed on season 11 of RuPaul's Drag Race. She was eliminated on the second episode. She has been described as  "Las Vegas's hip-hop showgirl" and someone who "merges street influences with upscale high fashion couture". Her drag "mother" is season 5 contestant Coco Montrese. In 2019, she released a single and music video for "Scores". The video features Manila Luzon, Peppermint, and Trinity the Tuck. Kahanna Montrese and other cast members of RuPaul's Drag Race Live! appeared on the season 14 finale (2022). She also appeared at the 64th Annual Grammy Awards (2022).

Personal life
Kahanna Montrese was born in Denver, Colorado, and grew up in Panama City Beach, Florida.  She now lives in Las Vegas, Nevada, as of 2019.

Discography

Singles
 "Scores"

Filmography

Television
 RuPaul's Drag Race (season 11; 2019)

References

External links
 Tyrone Hardiman at IMDb

Living people
African-American drag queens
American drag queens
People from Denver
People from Las Vegas
RuPaul's Drag Race contestants
Year of birth missing (living people)